St. Mary's Convent School is a co-ed day school in Ujjain, Madhya Pradesh, India, providing public school education up to the senior secondary level (Class 12), which started in 1964.

The institution is administered and run by the Franciscan Sisters of St. Mary of the Angels (FSMA), a religious charitable institute which has established several schools in the country. The school is affiliated with the highly recognized Central Board of Secondary Education (CBSE).

Principal- SR. S. ROBISES(as of 2023)

Offical Website - http://www.stmarysujjain.in/fsma/Default.html

Notable People 

Saumya Tandon
She did her schooling from St. Mary's Convent School Ujjain.Her father, B.G.Tandon, is a writer and was a professor in a university in Ujjain.

Ujjawal Anand Sharma
He is an advocate practicing at Supreme Court of India & Partner at Lawmen & White. He has represented Actor Sonu Sood before the Hon'ble Supreme Court of India. He did his schooling at St. Mary's Convent School Ujjain.

History 

St. Mary’s Convent Senior Secondary School Ujjain is run by the Franciscan Sisters of St. Mary of the Angels (F.S.M.A) a religious Congregation dates back to 8 July 1964. Three young enthusiastic and zealous pioneers arrived at Ujjain to open an English Medium School in response to the demand of the local population and Mr. Tickoo, the then Collector of Ujjain. 

The School started officially functioning in August 1964 in a rented building at Freeganj with about 150 students on the roll. In the year 1966, the school was shifted to its present building. In the 51 years of its operation, thousands of students have joyously spent their best years here. Today, it has more than 2000 students enrolled.

The school currently operates at four levels of education:

 Pre-Primary: Classes LKG and UKG
 Primary: Classes 1 to 5
 Secondary (Juniors): Classes 6-8
 Secondary (Seniors): Classes 9-12 (includes Senior Secondary (Classes 11 and 12))

Franciscan high schools
Christian schools in Madhya Pradesh
High schools and secondary schools in Madhya Pradesh
Education in Ujjain
Educational institutions established in 1964
1964 establishments in Madhya Pradesh